Guayama barrio-pueblo  is a barrio and the administrative center (seat) of Guayama, a municipality of Puerto Rico. Its population in 2010 was 16,891.

As was customary in Spain, in Puerto Rico, the municipality has a barrio called pueblo which contains a central plaza, the municipal buildings (city hall), and a Catholic church. Fiestas patronales (patron saint festivals) are held in the central plaza every year.

History
Puerto Rico was ceded by Spain in the aftermath of the Spanish–American War under the terms of the Treaty of Paris of 1898 and became an unincorporated territory of the United States. In 1899, the United States Department of War conducted a census of Puerto Rico finding that the population of Guayama Pueblo was 5,334.

The central plaza and its church
The central plaza is a place for official and unofficial recreational events and a place where people can gather and socialize from dusk to dawn. The Laws of the Indies, Spanish law, which regulated life in Puerto Rico in the early 19th century, stated the plaza's purpose was for "parties" (celebrations, festivities, festivals), and that the square should be proportionally large enough for the number of neighbors. These Spanish regulations also stated that nearby streets should be comfortable portals for passersby, protecting them from the elements: sun and rain.

A hermitage built in the area was in ruins by 1823. The first church after that was inaugurated in 1872. Parts of the church were destroyed by the 1899 San Ciriaco hurricane. In the 1920s the church underwent reconstruction.

Gallery

See also

 List of communities in Puerto Rico

References

Barrios of Guayama, Puerto Rico